Built to Destroy is the fourth studio album by the hard rock band Michael Schenker Group. Gary Barden returned to the group on vocals following the departure of Graham Bonnet amidst tensions with Michael Schenker. This was the band's final studio album prior to their disbanding, and Schenker moving on to form the McAuley Schenker Group with vocalist Robin McAuley. New material released under the Michael Schenker Group name would not appear for over a decade.

The song "Captain Nemo" is the theme song for Eddie Trunk's radio shows Friday Night Rocks on WAXQ and Trunk Nation on XM Radio's Hair Nation Channel.

Track listing

(UK and Japan LP)

(US Remix LP) 

 The 2009 EMI's Remaster CD includes both UK and US mixes of all songs (18 tracks) with the UK ones listed first. The original title "Walk the Stage", then to be changed to "Rock Will Never Die", on this remaster is listed as "Rock Will Never Die (Walk the Stage)".
 The song "Walk the Stage" has various name changes for different releases:
Built to Destroy: "Walk the Stage" (UK), "Rock Will Never Die" (US and worldwide);
Rock Will Never Die (LP): "Rock Will Never Die";
Rock Will Never Die (VHS): "Dream On";

Personnel 
Band members
 Michael Schenker – guitars
 Gary Barden – vocals
 Chris Glen – bass
 Ted McKenna – drums
 Andy Nye – keyboards

Additional musicians
 Derek St. Holmes – sings the verses on the American Remix of "Still Love That Little Devil", Gary Barden sings both verses and chorus on the UK Mix.

Credits 
 Producer – MSG & Louis Austin
 Recorded and mixed at – Ridge Farm studios, Rusper
 Engineer – Louis Austin 
 Assistant engineer – Richard Manwaring  
 Tape Operator – George Chambers
 Tape Operator – Gavin MacKillop
 Mixing – R.G. Jones
 Cover concept – Michael Schenker
 Art direction – John Pasche
 Cover photos – John Shaw
 Cover model – Caroline Dodd
 Inner sleeve photography – Brian Aris
 Project coordinator – Nigel Reeve 
 Project coordinator – Hugh Gilmour 
 Bonus tracks remixed at the Record Plant, New York City by Jack Douglas
 José Luis Campuzano, credited as co-writer of "Red Sky", is the bassist and singer of the Spanish heavy metal band Baron Rojo. He is also known as "Sherpa".

Charts

References 

1983 albums
Michael Schenker Group albums
Chrysalis Records albums